The 1989 World Games, commonly known as Karlsruhe 1989, were the third edition of the World Games, an international multi-sport event held in Karlsruhe, West Germany.

Titles
112 titles were awarded in 19 sports (5 invitational sports not included).

 As Invitational sport

Medal table 

The medal tally was as follows. Italy won the most gold medals in this edition; West Germany led in overall medals. Two bronze medals were awarded in the men's karate kata event and in each karate kumite (10) and taekwondo (12) event.

Opening Event
The opening event was created and organised by Traumfabrik

References

External links
 Official Website of the IWGA
 Medal table at Sports123 (by Internet Archive)
Traumfabrik.de

 
1989
World Games
World Games
International sports competitions hosted by West Germany
Multi-sport events in West Germany
Sport in Karlsruhe
20th century in Karlsruhe
July 1989 sports events in Europe